The Battle of the Drina (Serbian:) was fought between Serbian and Austro-Hungarian armies in September 1914, near Loznica, Serbia, during the First Serbian campaign of World War I.

After a first failed invasion of Serbia where he lost 40,000 men, Oskar Potiorek, the Austro-Hungarian commander of the Balkanstreitkräfte, launched a new offensive across the River Drina at the western Serbian border; after successfully crossing the river the night of 7—8 September the Austro-Hungarian forces were stopped facing strong Serbian defensive positions. In the meantime the Serbian Army was forced to end their offensive into Austrian Syrmia and regroup their forces to face the new threat, while in the far west a smaller force of Serbian and Montenegrin troops moved into Bosnia taking Višegrad. In the South the Austrians took Shabatz (Šabac). On 17 September a counter-attack pushed the Austrians back to the Drina where both sides settled into trench warfare.

The Battle of the Drina is considered one of the bloodiest on the war's Balkan Front.

Prelude
After being defeated in the Battle of Cer in August 1914, the Austro-Hungarian army retreated over the Drina river back into Bosnia and Syrmia. Under the pressure of the Allies, Serbia conducted an offensive across the Sava river into the Austro-Hungarian region of Syrmia taking Zemun going as far as 20 miles into enemy territory. Meanwhile, the Timok First Division of the Serbian Second Army suffered heavy loss in a diversionary crossing when a bridge collapsed causing panic, suffering around 6,000 casualties while inflicting only 2,000.

With most of his forces in Bosnia, general Oskar Potiorek decided that the best way to stop the Serbian offensive was to launch another invasion into Serbia to force the Serbs to recall their troops to defend their homeland.

Offensive

On 7 September, a renewed Austro-Hungarian attack started from the west, across the river Drina, this time with both the Fifth Army in Mačva and the Sixth Army further south. The initial attack by the Fifth Army was repelled by the Serbian Second Army, with 4,000 Austro-Hungarian casualties, forcing them back into Bosnia. The stronger Sixth Army managed to surprise the Serbian Third Army and gained a foothold into Serbian territory. After some units from the Serbian Second Army were sent to bolster the Third, the Austro-Hungarian Fifth Army also managed to establish a bridgehead with a renewed attack.

Field Marshal Radomir Putnik withdrew the First Army from Syrmia force marching them south to deliver a fierce counterattack against the Sixth Army that initially went well but finally bogged down in a bloody four-day fight for a peak of the Jagodnja mountain called Mačkov Kamen, in which both sides suffered horrendous losses in successive frontal attacks and counterattacks. The two Serbian divisions lost around 11,000 men, while Austro-Hungarian losses were probably comparable. On 25 September the Austrian 6th Army withdrew to avoid getting outflanked.

Field Marshal Putnik ordered its troops to take up position into the surrounding hills and the front settled in a month and a half of trench warfare, which was highly unfavourable to the Serbs, who possessed heavy artillery that was largely obsolete, had short ammunition stocks, limited shell production (having only a single factory producing around 100 shells a day) and also a lack of proper footwear, since the vast majority of infantry wore the traditional (though state-issued) opanaks, while the Austro-Hungarians had soak-proof leather boots. Most of the war material was supplied by the Allies, who were short themselves. In such a situation, Serbian artillery quickly became almost silent, while the Austro-Hungarians steadily increased their fire. Serbian daily casualties reached 100 soldiers from all causes in some divisions.

During the first weeks of trench warfare, the Serbian Užice Army (one strengthened division) and the Montenegrin Sanjak Army (roughly a division) conducted an offensive into Bosnia taking Visegrad on 14 September. In addition, both sides conducted a few local attacks, none of which succeeded.

Aftermath 
Although the Serbs successfully halted the second Austrian invasion of Serbia, the Austro-Hungarian kept a foothold on Serbian territory from where they were to launch a third invasion.

Casualties 
Military historian Mark Clodfelter reports 40,000 casualties for the attacking Austro-Hungarian army, and 30 000 casualties for the defending Serbian army. Two Austrian corps sustained almost 30,000 casualties and one Serbian division suffered 6,000 casualties.

See also
 Battle of Cer
 Battle of Kolubara

References

Sources
 
 
 

 http://www.rastko.org.yu/svecovek/ustrojstvo/namesnistva/radjevina/krupanj/spomen_crkva_l.html
 
 

Drina
1914 in Serbia
Drina
Drina
Drina
Drina
September 1914 events
October 1914 events